Giovanna Troldi (born 31 October 1968) is a road cyclist from Italy. 

She won the Italian National Time Trial Championships in 2002, 2003, and 2004 and represented her nation at the 2003 UCI Road World Championships.

References

External links
 profile at Procyclingstats.com

1968 births
Italian female cyclists
Living people
People from Dolo
Cyclists from the Metropolitan City of Venice